Francesco Magnanelli (born 12 November 1984) is an Italian former professional football midfielder. He is currently the all-time record appearance holder for Sassuolo.

Career
Throughout his club career, Magnanelli has played for several Italian sides: he began his career with Gubbio in 2000, and later played for Chievo, Fiorentina, and Sangiovannese, before joining Sassuolo in 2005, where he helped the team from Serie C2 to Serie A promotion; he won the Serie C1 and Serie B titles with the club in 2008 and 2013 respectively, and was later named the team's captain. In June 2015 he signed a new two-year contract with Sassuolo.

On 29 October 2019, Magnanelli have been given one-match ban for blasphemy during Serie A matches. There is a strict ban on taking God's name in vain in Italy.

On 19 May 2022, Magnanelli announced his retirement from playing at the end of the season.

Style of play
Magnanelli has been described as a talented, purposeful, humble and hard-working midfielder. He is usually deployed in the centre, and is known in particular for his leadership and passing range, as well as his tactical awareness, and reading of the game, in addition to his tenacity, and ability to win back possession or intercept passes as a defensive midfielder.

Career statistics

Honours
Sassuolo
Serie C1: 2007–08
Supercoppa di Lega di Serie C1: 2008
Serie B: 2012–13

References

External links
 
 

1984 births
Living people
People from Umbertide
Association football midfielders
Italian footballers
Serie A players
Serie B players
A.S. Gubbio 1910 players
A.S.D. Sangiovannese 1927 players
U.S. Sassuolo Calcio players
Sportspeople from the Province of Perugia
Footballers from Umbria